Tiaki Chan (born 15 June 2000) is a professional rugby league footballer who plays as a  for the Catalans Dragons in the Super League.

In 2022 he made his Catalans debut in the Super League against the Leeds Rhinos.

Personal life
Chan's father Alex is a former Catalans Dragons and New Zealand international player. His brother Joe is also a professional rugby league  footballer.

References

External links
Catalans Dragons profile

2000 births
Living people
Australian rugby league players
Catalans Dragons players
Rugby league props